Dr. Clara Southmayd Ludlow (1852–1924) was an American entomologist, the first woman known to publish extensively on the taxonomy of mosquitoes and their occurrence in relation to the incidence of mosquito-borne diseases. She forged a notable career in medical entomology during a time when women were rare among the ranks of entomologists, and she did so in association with the military, where the presence of women was even more rare. Details of her life have been addressed in two publications, from which the following summary is drawn.

Early life
Clara Southmayd Ludlow was born on December 26, 1852, at Easton, Pennsylvania, the eldest child of Jacob Rapalje and Anna Mary (Hunt) Ludlow. Her childhood was disrupted significantly by the American Civil War, in which her father served as Surgeon of the 1st Regiment, Pennsylvania Volunteers, United States Army.

In 1877, she enrolled in the New England Conservatory of Music, from which she graduated in 1879. In 1880 she was enumerated by the federal census at the Monticello Female Seminary near Alton, Illinois, her occupation listed as "Music [Teacher]."  Her entry in the 1925 edition of the Biographical Cyclopedia of American Women states that "for many years she made music her profession, teaching and doing a certain amount of concert work." Her professional records, deposited at the National Museum of Health and Medicine in Washington, D.C., begin with the year 1889, suggesting that at some point in the late 1880s, she began to turn to science as an avocation or perhaps vocation.

Education and career as a scientist
By 1897, she was a student at Mississippi Agricultural & Mechanical College (now Mississippi State University) in Starkville, Mississippi. She graduated from Mississippi A&M in 1900 with the degree of Bachelor of Science in Agriculture. In 1901, she was awarded the Master of Arts degree in Botany by Mississippi A&M, reportedly 31 years before a graduate program was formally offered by that institution. One of her preserved works is a folder of drawings of Viola species (the violets) in the Edward Lee Greene Papers of the University of Notre Dame Archives, perhaps obtained by Professor Greene when he worked in the Washington, D.C., area as a faculty member of the Botany Department of the Catholic University of America from 1885-1904, or in his capacity as an associate in botany at the Smithsonian Institution from 1904-1909, either of which positions might have brought him into professional correspondence with Ludlow.

After graduation in 1901 with her Masters of Arts degree, Ludlow traveled to Manila, Republic of the Philippines, to visit a brother who was stationed there as an artillery officer in the United States Army. Approximately one year later, she returned to the States with her brother, who had contracted an illness, but during her stay in Manila, she began an association with military medicine that would endure for the rest of her life.

In 1904, she was Lecturer on mosquitoes and disease at the Army Medical Museum in Washington, D.C.  By 1907, she was Demonstrator of Histology and Embryology at George Washington University in Washington, D.C., where she received her Doctor of Philosophy degree in 1908. Her doctoral dissertation was entitled "The Mosquitoes of the Philippine Islands: The Distribution of Certain Species and Their Occurrence in Relation to the Incidence of Certain Diseases". She remained on the faculty of George Washington University, where in 1909 she was Instructor of Histology and Embryology.

From 1916 through 1920 she served as Anatomist at the Army Medical Museum, now the National Museum of Health and Medicine, on the Walter Reed Army Medical Center post in Washington, D.C. Her records at the museum, consisting of correspondence, notes, reports, logbooks, and other research materials, state that her research centered on identifying mosquitoes, including a project working with specimens sent in from military posts that resulted in the production of a Museum film, "Mosquito Eradication," in 1918. During 1920, she became the museum's Chief Entomologist, a position she held until her death.

Death and interment
Ludlow died on September 28, 1924, in Washington, D.C. and is interred in Arlington National Cemetery, in Section 2, Grave No. 3843, beside her father.  Her grave is located under a large oak below the Old Amphitheater adjacent to Arlington House.  Her stone states only her name and date of death, and "daughter of Jacob"—hardly an adequate memorial for this great lady.

Honors
In 1908 Ludlow was elected to active membership in the American Society of Tropical Medicine, the first woman and the first non-physician scientist member of the society. She is included in a bibliography of biographies of entomologists published in 1945, but the cited obituary, published in the Journal of the Washington Academy of Sciences, states only that "[h]er work was mainly in connection with the disease prevention activities of the army" and does not mention her pioneering role as a public health entomologist. The failure of her peers to fully memorialize her remarkable achievements may be in some part due to her reportedly irascible personality; and as well, it may reflect the sexism of early twentieth century America.

In 2017, the American Society of Tropical Medicine and Hygiene began awarding a medal named after Dr. Ludlow, "a woman icon in tropical medicine" recognizing honorees of either gender for their "inspirational and pioneering spirit, whose work represents success despite obstacles and advances in tropical medicine."

Photographs

A photograph of Ludlow was published in an issue of Mosquito Systematics dedicated to her in 1987. Three previously unknown photographs of her, discovered in the George Washington University Archives, Kayser Photographic Collection, in Washington, D.C. were published in 2005 with the permission of the Gelman Library, Special Collections Department/University Archives, Washington, D.C.

References

American entomologists
Women entomologists
20th-century American women scientists
George Washington University alumni
Mississippi State University alumni
1852 births
1924 deaths
Burials at Arlington National Cemetery
Smithsonian Institution people
20th-century American zoologists
People from Easton, Pennsylvania
Scientists from Pennsylvania
New England Conservatory alumni